Dirk I may refer to:

 Dirk I, Count of Holland from ca. 896 to ca. 928 or 939
 Dirk I (bishop) (died in 1197) 
 Dirk I van Brederode (ca. 1180–1236)